Bankers Investment Trust is a large British investment trust dedicated to investments in major international businesses, particularly FTSE 100 companies. The company is a constituent of the FTSE 250 Index.

History
The company was incorporated in 1888. Seven of the directors at that time were bankers so it was named Bankers Investment Trust. Following financial difficulties in the Australian banking sector, it was unable to pay dividends in 1892 and 1893. It was first listed on the London Stock Exchange in 1857.

Investment activity
The company is managed by Alex Crooke of Janus Henderson and the chairman is Susan Inglis who was appointed in September 2018.

The company's largest investments as at 31 October 2022 were as follows:

References

External links
  Official site

Financial services companies established in 1888
Investment trusts of the United Kingdom
Companies listed on the London Stock Exchange